Hot Chicken Takeover is an American fast casual fried chicken restaurant chain in Columbus, Ohio that specializes in Nashville hot chicken.

History
Founder Joe DeLoss started the company after visiting Nashville, Tennessee and being introduced to the local specialty hot chicken in 2013. The company was initially founded as a pop-up restaurant in April 2014, before launching a crowdfunding campaign on Kickstarter later that year to fund the purchase of a food truck.

Employment policies
The company received significant media coverage for its stated mission of being a "fair chance employer" that provides job opportunities to formerly incarcerated people who are reentering the workforce and other individuals who are not otherwise able to find work. In 2016, over 70% of Hot Chicken Takeover employees were formerly incarcerated or formerly affected by homelessness. Founder Joe DeLoss has stated that workers with former criminal histories are better and more reliable employees than others, and that the company employs anyone with "an orientation towards personal growth and a willingness to respond to coaching".

The company also provides various free professional development initiatives for its employees such as financial literacy training and private personal counseling, as well as emergency 0% payday loans or cash support so that employees are not at risk of predatory lenders.

Locations 

, Hot Chicken Takeover has three locations in Columbus, Ohio. The first location is in the historic North Market building in downtown Columbus, the second is located in the Clintonville neighborhood and the newest location is at Easton Gateway in Easton Town Center. The company also continues to own a food truck, which has previously been voted "Best Food Truck in Columbus" by the readers of local news blog Columbus Underground in 2015 and 2016. 
In 2019, they made their Cleveland area debut, opening a new location at Crocker Park in the western suburb of Westlake.

Joe DeLoss announced plans in a 2016 interview to expand via franchising.

References

External links
 

2014 establishments in Ohio
Companies based in the Columbus, Ohio metropolitan area
Chicken chains of the United States
Restaurants established in 2014
Restaurants in Ohio